Henry H. R. Coe (April 29, 1946 – January 21, 2021) was an American politician who served as a Republican member of the Wyoming Senate, representing the 18th district from 1989 until 2021. He served as the President of the Senate in the 2001-2002 session. He was the son of the philanthropist Henry Huttleston Rogers Coe. Coe died from pancreatic cancer in 2021, shortly after leaving office, having been diagnosed in November 2020.

References

1946 births
2021 deaths
20th-century American politicians
21st-century American politicians
Deaths from cancer in Wyoming
Deaths from pancreatic cancer
People from Cody, Wyoming
Presidents of the Wyoming Senate
Republican Party Wyoming state senators
University of Wyoming alumni